The Wheeler–Feynman absorber theory (also called the Wheeler–Feynman time-symmetric theory), named after its originators, the physicists Richard Feynman and John Archibald Wheeler, is an interpretation of electrodynamics derived from the assumption that the solutions of the electromagnetic field equations must be invariant under time-reversal transformation, as are the field equations themselves. Indeed, there is no apparent reason for the time-reversal symmetry breaking, which singles out a preferential time direction and thus makes a distinction between past and future. A time-reversal invariant theory is more logical and elegant. Another key principle, resulting from this interpretation and reminiscent of Mach's principle due to Hugo Tetrode, is that elementary particles are not self-interacting. This immediately removes the problem of self-energies.

T-symmetry and causality
The requirement of time-reversal symmetry, in general, is difficult to reconcile with the principle of causality. Maxwell's equations and the equations for electromagnetic waves have, in general, two possible solutions: a retarded (delayed) solution and an advanced one. Accordingly, any charged particle generates waves, say at time  and point , which will arrive at point  at the instant  (here  is the speed of light), after the emission (retarded solution), and other waves, which will arrive at the same place at the instant , before the emission (advanced solution). The latter, however, violates the causality principle: advanced waves could be detected before their emission. Thus the advanced solutions are usually discarded in the interpretation of electromagnetic waves.  In the absorber theory, instead charged particles are considered as both emitters and absorbers, and the emission process is connected with the absorption process as follows: Both the retarded waves from emitter to absorber and the advanced waves from absorber to emitter are considered. The sum of the two, however, results in causal waves, although the anti-causal (advanced) solutions are not discarded a priori.

Feynman and Wheeler obtained this result in a very simple and elegant way. They considered all the charged particles (emitters) present in our universe and assumed all of them to generate time-reversal symmetric waves. The resulting field is

Then they observed that if the relation

holds, then , being a solution of the homogeneous Maxwell equation, can be used to obtain the total field

The total field is retarded, and causality is not violated.

The assumption that the free field is identically zero is the core of the absorber idea. It means that the radiation emitted by each particle is completely absorbed by all other particles present in the universe. To better understand this point, it may be useful to consider how the absorption mechanism works in common materials. At the microscopic scale, it results from the sum of the incoming electromagnetic wave and the waves generated from the electrons of the material, which react to the external perturbation. If the incoming wave is absorbed, the result is a zero outgoing field. In the absorber theory the same concept is used, however, in presence of both retarded and advanced waves.

The resulting wave appears to have a preferred time direction, because it respects causality. However, this is only an illusion. Indeed, it is always possible to reverse the time direction by simply exchanging the labels emitter and absorber. Thus, the apparently preferred time direction results from the arbitrary labelling.

Alternatively, the way that Wheeler/Feynman came up with the primary equation is: They assumed that their Lagrangian only interacted when and where the fields for the individual particles were separated by a proper time of zero.  So since only massless particles propagate from emission to detection with zero proper time separation, this Lagrangian automatically demands an electromagnetic like interaction.

T-symmetry and self-interaction
One of the major results of the absorber theory is the elegant and clear interpretation of the electromagnetic radiation process. A charged particle that experiences acceleration is known to emit electromagnetic waves, i.e., to lose energy. Thus, the Newtonian equation for the particle  must contain a dissipative force (damping term), which takes into account this energy loss. In the causal interpretation of electromagnetism, Lorentz and Abraham proposed that such a force, later called Abraham–Lorentz force, is due to the retarded self-interaction of the particle with its own field. This first interpretation, however, is not completely satisfactory, as it leads to divergences in the theory and needs some assumptions on the structure of charge distribution of the particle. Dirac generalized the formula to make it relativistically invariant. While doing so, he also suggested a different interpretation. He showed that the damping term can be expressed in terms of a free field acting on the particle at its own position:

However, Dirac did not propose any physical explanation of this interpretation.

A clear and simple explanation can instead be obtained in the framework of absorber theory, starting from the simple idea that each particle does not interact with itself. This is actually the opposite of the first Abraham–Lorentz proposal. The field acting on the particle  at its own position (the point ) is then

If we sum the free-field term of this expression, we obtain

and, thanks to Dirac's result, 

Thus, the damping force is obtained without the need for self-interaction, which is known to lead to divergences, and also giving a physical justification to the expression derived by Dirac.

Criticism 
The Abraham–Lorentz force is, however, not free of problems. Written in the non-relativistic limit, it gives

Written in relativistic form (SI units), the magnitude of the force is the proper time derivative of the proper acceleration:

Since the third derivative with respect to the time (also called the "jerk" or "jolt") enters in the equation of motion, to derive a solution one needs not only the initial position and velocity of the particle, but also its initial acceleration. This apparent problem, however, can be solved in the absorber theory by observing that the equation of motion for the particle has to be solved together with the Maxwell equations for the field. In this case, instead of the initial acceleration, one only needs to specify the initial field and the boundary condition. This interpretation restores the coherence of the physical interpretation of the theory.

Other difficulties may arise trying to solve the equation of motion for a charged particle in the presence of this damping force. It is commonly stated that the Maxwell equations are classical and cannot correctly account for microscopic phenomena, such as the behavior of a point-like particle, where quantum-mechanical effects should appear. Nevertheless, with absorber theory, Wheeler and Feynman were able to create a coherent classical approach to the problem (see also the "paradoxes" section in the Abraham–Lorentz force).

Also, the time-symmetric interpretation of the electromagnetic waves appears to be in contrast with the experimental evidence that time flows in a given direction and, thus, that the T-symmetry is broken in our world. It is commonly believed, however, that this symmetry breaking appears only in the thermodynamical limit (see, for example, the arrow of time). Wheeler himself accepted that the expansion of the universe is not time-symmetric in the thermodynamic limit. This, however, does not imply that the T-symmetry must be broken also at the microscopic level.

Finally, the main drawback of the theory turned out to be the result that particles are not self-interacting. Indeed, as demonstrated by Hans Bethe, the Lamb shift necessitated a self-energy term to be explained. Feynman and Bethe had an intense discussion over that issue, and eventually Feynman himself stated that self-interaction is needed to correctly account for this effect.

Developments since original formulation

Gravity theory

Inspired by the Machian nature of the Wheeler–Feynman absorber theory for electrodynamics, Fred Hoyle and Jayant Narlikar proposed their own theory of gravity in the context of general relativity. This model still exists in spite of recent astronomical observations that have challenged the theory. Stephen Hawking had criticized the original Hoyle-Narlikar theory believing that the advanced waves going off to infinity would lead to a divergence, as indeed they would, if the universe were only expanding.

Transactional interpretation of quantum mechanics

Again inspired by the Wheeler–Feynman absorber theory, the transactional interpretation of quantum mechanics (TIQM) first proposed in 1986 by John G. Cramer, describes quantum interactions in terms of a standing wave formed by retarded (forward-in-time) and advanced (backward-in-time) waves. Cramer claims it avoids the philosophical problems with the Copenhagen interpretation and the role of the observer, and resolves various quantum paradoxes, such as quantum nonlocality, quantum entanglement and retrocausality.

Attempted resolution of causality
T. C. Scott and R. A. Moore demonstrated that the apparent acausality suggested by the presence of advanced Liénard–Wiechert potentials could be removed by recasting the theory in terms of retarded potentials only, without the complications of the absorber idea.
The Lagrangian describing a particle under the influence of the time-symmetric potential generated by another particle is

The corresponding Lagrangian for particle  is

It was originally demonstrated with computer algebra and then proven analytically that

is a total time derivative, i.e. a divergence in the calculus of variations, and thus it gives no contribution to the Euler–Lagrange equations. Thanks to this result the advanced potentials can be eliminated; here the total derivative plays the same role as the free field. The Lagrangian for the N-body system is therefore

Therefore, from the point of view of an outside observer, everything is causal. This formulation reflects particle-particle symmetry with the variational principle applied to the N-particle system as a whole, and thus Tetrode's Machian principle. Only if we isolate the forces acting on a particular body do the advanced potentials make their appearance. This recasting of the problem comes at a price: the N-body Lagrangian depends on all the time derivatives of the curves traced by all particles, i.e. the Lagrangian is infinite-order. However, much progress was made in examining the unresolved issue of quantizing the theory. Also, this formulation recovers the Darwin Lagrangian, from which the Breit equation was originally derived, but without the dissipative terms. This ensures agreement with theory and experiment, up to but not including the Lamb shift. Numerical solutions for the classical problem were also found. Furthermore, Moore showed that a model by Feynman and Hibbs is amenable to the methods of higher than first-order Lagrangians and revealed chaoticlike solutions. Moore and Scott showed that the radiation reaction can be alternatively derived using the notion that, on average, the net dipole moment is zero for a collection of charged particles, thereby avoiding the complications of the absorber theory.

This apparent acausality may be viewed as merely apparent, and this entire problem goes away. An opposing view was held by Einstein.

Alternative Lamb shift calculation
As mentioned previously, a serious criticism against the absorber theory is that its Machian assumption that point particles do not act on themselves does not allow (infinite) self-energies and consequently an explanation for the Lamb shift according to quantum electrodynamics (QED). Ed Jaynes proposed an alternate model where the Lamb-like shift is due instead to the interaction with other particles very much along the same notions of the Wheeler–Feynman absorber theory itself. One simple model is to calculate the motion of an oscillator coupled directly with many other oscillators. Jaynes has shown that it is easy to get both spontaneous emission and Lamb shift behavior in classical mechanics.  Furthermore, Jaynes' alternative provides a solution to the process of "addition and subtraction of infinities" associated with renormalization.
 
This model leads to the same type of Bethe logarithm (an essential part of the Lamb shift calculation), vindicating Jaynes' claim that two different physical models can be mathematically isomorphic to each other and therefore yield the same results, a point also apparently made by Scott and Moore on the issue of causality.

Conclusions 
This universal absorber theory is mentioned in the chapter titled "Monster Minds" in Feynman's autobiographical work Surely You're Joking, Mr. Feynman! and in Vol. II of the Feynman Lectures on Physics. It led to the formulation of a framework of quantum mechanics using a Lagrangian and action as starting points, rather than a Hamiltonian, namely the formulation using Feynman path integrals, which proved useful in Feynman's earliest calculations in quantum electrodynamics and quantum field theory in general. Both retarded and advanced fields appear respectively as retarded and advanced propagators and also in the Feynman propagator and the Dyson propagator. In hindsight, the relationship between retarded and advanced potentials shown here is not so surprising in view of the fact that, in field theory, the advanced propagator can be obtained from the retarded propagator by exchanging the roles of field source and test particle (usually within the kernel of a Green's function formalism). In field theory, advanced and retarded fields are simply viewed as mathematical solutions of Maxwell's equations whose combinations are decided by the boundary conditions.

See also 
 Causality
 Symmetry in physics and T-symmetry
 Transactional interpretation
 Abraham–Lorentz force
 Retrocausality
 Two-state vector formalism
 Paradox of a charge in a gravitational field

Notes

Sources 

Electromagnetism
Richard Feynman